First Church in Charlestown was founded in 1632 in the Charlestown neighborhood of Boston, MA and was one of the oldest churches in Boston and the state of Massachusetts. It was dually aligned with both the United Church of Christ and the Southern Baptist Convention, holding to a conservative view of the Bible and holding to the traditional Reformed view of theology. It is the last church to be pastored by John Harvard, a founder, benefactor, and namesake of Harvard University.

History

1600s 
The church was founded in 1632 and held its services for a time in the Great House in the City Square and was later one of the six churches that led to the creation of Harvard University. Rev. John Harvard served as an assistant minister at the church until his death from tuberculosis, from 1637-1638. Rev. Increase Mather and his son Rev. Cotton Mather were close friends of the Shepherds of whom two of them, Thomas Sr. and Thomas Jr. became pastors of First Church.

1700s 
During the Revolutionary War, the British Army burned down the historic first building of First Church. A second building was built and used until the merger with its daughter church in the 1800s

1800s 
In the 1800s the church merged with its daughter congregation and moved into their facility which is the one used today as the current home of the church which shares some of the same architecture design as the original building. At one point, the church launched daughter churches in Charlestown and Old South Church in Boston, MA

1900s 
The church was used during the bussing controversy as a safe haven for African-American students. Some of the front windows are still boarded up today as a result of rocks and bricks being thrown through them in violence that rocked the city.

2000s 
The church has been historically and still is a Congregational church; upon the installation of Rev. Erik Maloy in 2015, the church also became a member of the Southern Baptist Convention through its affiliation with the Baptist Convention of New England. The church is also a part of The Gospel Coalition and 9 Marks networks, as well as one of the cohort churches in Overseed, an organization dedicated to reviving historic New England churches, by returning them to a Gospel preaching view of theology. The church has been going through a number of updates on its interior to make the church more modern in appearance. The downstairs fellowship area was updated in 2017 to include themed lights and a projector screen for presentations, as well as new paint and wood flooring. The Sanctuary was recently painted, as well as two LED TVs and a screen for music and other needs of the church.

At its height in 1837, the church had 271 members, in 2015 it had just 15, and, as of 2018, boasts 45-60 members and attendees. The church is involved in a number of activities within the Charleston neighborhood, that has helped its reputation with the community and made it begin to thrive once more.

In 2017, the church began to livestream its Sunday morning services on its Facebook page.

In 2022 First Church merged into a local church plant and became the new home of Christ Church Charlestown.

Design 
The current structure's design is similar to the original wood building. A fire in the 1950s caused the interior of the church to go through an extensive redesign. The balconies that surrounded the sanctuary were taken down and parts of the lower floor were enclosed to create Sunday School class rooms. The pews are of the art deco design on the 1960s.

Pastors 

 Thomas James (1632-1636)
 
 Zechariah Symmes (1634-1671)
 
 John Harvard (1637-1638)
 
 Thomas Allen (1639-1651)
 
 Thomas Shepherd (1659-1677)
 
 Thomas Shepherd Jr.(1680-1685)
 
 Charles Morton (1686-1698)
 
 Simon Bradstreet (1698-1741)
 
 Joseph Stevens (1713-1721)
 
 Hull Abbot (1724-1774)
 
 Thomas Pretince(1739-1782)
 
 Joshua Paine(1787-1788)
 
 Jedidiah Morse(1789-1819)
 
 Warren Fay (1819-1840)
 
 William Ives Buddington (1840-1854)
 
 James B. Miles (1855-1867
 
 Benjamin W. Pond (1867-1871)
 
 F.F. Ford (1872-1874)
 
 Henry L. Kendall (1776-1879)
 
 George W. Brooks (1883-1889)
 
 William G. Schoppe (1890-1893)
 
 Charles F. Crathern (1893-1896)
 
 Charles H. Pope (1896-1901)
 
 Peter McQueen (1901-1907)
 
 James McD. Blue (1907-1912)
 
 Charles H. Talmage (1914-1923)
 
 Thomas W. Davison (1925-1944)
 
 Thomas W. Kidd (1947-1954)
 
 William A. Burnett (1956-1973)
 
 Charles Harrah(1973-1978)
 
 Victor Ford (1978-2000)
 
 Christine Jaronski (2000-2008)
 
 Erik Maloy (2015–2022)

References 

Southern Baptist Convention churches
19th-century Baptist churches in the United States
Baptist churches in Boston
19th-century United Church of Christ church buildings
Charlestown, Boston
Gothic Revival church buildings in Massachusetts
Members of the World Alliance of Reformed Churches
United Church of Christ churches in Massachusetts
Stone churches in Massachusetts